The Juan Amarillo, Arzobispo, or Salitre River is a river on the Bogotá savanna and a left tributary of the Bogotá River in Colombia. The river originates from various quebradas in the Eastern Hills and flows into the Bogotá River at the largest of the wetlands of Bogotá, Tibabuyes, also called Juan Amarillo Wetland. Together with the Fucha and Tunjuelo Rivers, the Juan Amarillo River forms part of the left tributaries of the Bogotá River in the Colombian capital.

Description 

Main feeder creeks are Las Delicias, La Vieja, El Chicó, Los Molinos, Santa Bárbara, Delicias del Carmen, El Cóndor, El Cedro, San Cristóbal, La Cita and La Floresta. The Juan Amarillo Basin covers the localities Usaquén, Chapinero and Santa Fe in its upper course and Suba, Barrios Unidos, Teusaquillo and Engativá in its lower drainage area. The Suba Hills (cerros de Suba) are located in the Juan Amarillo River basin.

The river transports  of solid sediments, of which  reach the mouth of the river near the Tibabuyes wetland.

Wetlands 

Six of the fifteen protected wetlands of Bogotá are located in the Juan Amarillo River basin.

Gallery

See also 

List of rivers of Colombia
Eastern Hills, Bogotá
Bogotá savanna
Fucha River, Tunjuelo River

References

Bibliography

External links 
  Sistema Hídrico, Bogotá

Rivers of Colombia
Bogotá River
Geography of Bogotá
Rivers